Scopula euchroa is a moth of the family Geometridae. It was described by Prout in 1925. It is endemic to South Africa.

References

Endemic moths of South Africa
Moths described in 1925
euchroa
Taxa named by Louis Beethoven Prout